Carl Bennett is an American retired professional soccer player.

Career
A native of Seattle, Bennett spent two seasons with the Dallas Tornado of the North American Soccer League. When the team was merged with the Tampa Bay Rowdies shortly after the 1981 season, he was one of several Tornado players Tampa Bay chose to retain. An unfortunate string of knee injuries limited his playing time and the Rowdies ultimately released him at the start of the 1983 season. Upon his release the Carolina Lightnin' of the American Soccer League quickly picked Bennett up, but he suffered yet another injury in his first appearance, and by mid-June was released to make roster space for another player. 

As a youth, Bennett made two appearances for the United States U19 squad.

Honors
North American Soccer League
1981–82 indoor: Finalist

References

External links
NASL stats

1961 births
Living people
Soccer players from Seattle
American Soccer League (1933–1983) players
Carolina Lightnin' players 
North American Soccer League (1968–1984) players
North American Soccer League (1968–1984) indoor players
Dallas Tornado players
Tampa Bay Rowdies (1975–1993) players
Association football defenders
American soccer players
United States men's under-20 international soccer players